Éric Renaut (born 11 April 1954) is a French former professional footballer who played as a centre-back and midfielder. He spent the majority of his career at Paris Saint-Germain.

Club career 
Renaut was a product of the Paris Saint-Germain Academy. He had joined the club in 1970 after his hometown club of Stade Saint-Germain merged with Paris FC to create Paris Saint-Germain. Renaut's debuts for PSG's first team came in 1972, helping the club achieve promotion to the Division 2. Another successive promotion followed, with Renaut playing a key part again in the club's return to the Division 1.

Apart from a loan to Sochaux during the 1975–76 season, Renaut was a player of Paris Saint-Germain from 1972 to 1982. He left after having made 290 appearances and scored 35 goals for the club across all competitions, ranking as the player with the most appearances for PSG at the time of his departure. The 1981–82 Coupe de France was the only trophy he won with the Parisians.

Renaut continued his career at RC Paris, Sète, Red Star, and Chantilly before retiring in 1990.

International career 
Renaut represented France on many levels. He was initially a youth international, then a amateur international, and also a military international. From 1975 to 1977, he played for the France U21s, known as Les Espoirs. With them, Renaut would win the 1977 Toulon Tournament.

Renaut also played one match for the France B team in 1978. He would additionally receive one call-up to the main national team, but he never made any appearances.

Managerial career 
Renaut's first managerial position came at the club he retired at, Chantilly. From 1991 to 1996, he coached .

After football 
Later in his life, Renaut would become the manager of a sports equipment broadcasting company called ERD Diffusion. After this, he would create SMC, a sports communication company specialized in communicating over large sporting events.

Starting in 1999, Renaut began to work as a football agent in France for IMG, a company founded by Mark McCormack.

Honours 
France U21
 Toulon Tournament: 1977

Paris Saint-Germain
 Coupe de France: 1981–82

RC Paris
 Division 2: 1985–86

References

External links 
 
 

1954 births
Living people
French footballers
Sportspeople from Saint-Germain-en-Laye
Association football central defenders
Association football midfielders
French football managers
French sports agents
Association football agents
Stade Saint-Germain players
Paris Saint-Germain F.C. players
FC Sochaux-Montbéliard players
Racing Club de France Football players
FC Sète 34 players
Red Star F.C. players
US Chantilly players
France youth international footballers
France under-21 international footballers
France B international footballers
US Chantilly managers
French Division 3 (1971–1993) players
Ligue 2 players
Ligue 1 players
French Division 4 (1978–1993) players
France amateur international footballers
Footballers from Yvelines